West Health is a family of non-profit, nonpartisan organizations that includes the Gary and Mary West Foundation, a private foundation and the West Health Institute, an applied medical research organization, based in San Diego and the West Health Policy Center, based in Washington, D.C. Its mission is to lower healthcare costs to enable seniors to successfully age in place with access to high-quality, affordable health and support services that preserve and protect their dignity, quality of life and independence. West Health is solely funded by entrepreneurs and philanthropists Gary and Mary West.

West Health Institute
The West Health Institute was created in 2009 with an initial $45 million grant from the Gary and Mary West Foundation. The applied medical research organization works with healthcare providers, community organizations and academic institutions to improve or validate models of care that lower healthcare costs and improve the holistic delivery of medical, dental and social services  for seniors. Current topics of research include geriatric emergency care, telehealth, value-based care, oral health for seniors, home-based primary care and malnutrition.

West Health Policy Center
The West Health Policy Center is a nonprofit, based in Washington, D.C., focused on identifying policy solutions and innovations that improve access to high-quality healthcare and social services for seniors while slowing the trajectory of rising healthcare costs. The group's current focus is on the high cost of prescription drugs and medical services, increasing the number of accredited geriatric emergency departments, increasing access to oral healthcare services for vulnerable seniors and expanding the Program for All-Inclusive Care of the Elderly (PACE) throughout the U.S. The research and policy proposals generated by the Policy Center are used to help healthcare providers, policy makers and communities make informed decisions about new models of care and their impact on outcomes, costs and quality of life.

Gary and Mary West Foundation 
The nonprofit Gary and Mary West Foundation is an outcomes based philanthropy dedicated to lowering the cost of healthcare to enable seniors to successfully age in place with access to high-quality, affordable health and support services that preserve and protect their dignity, quality of life and independence. Since 2006, the Gary and Mary West Foundation has awarded over 615 grants totaling more than $231 million to nonprofit organizations and institutions that share its successful aging mission. The foundation accepts grant proposals by invitation only. Key grants include those for California's Master Plan for Aging, the Gary and Mary West Senior Emergency Care Unit at UC San Diego, Gary and Mary West PACE, Gary and Mary West Senior Wellness Center, the Gary and Mary West Senior Dental Center and CivicaRX, a nonprofit generic drug manufacturer.

Leadership
Shelley Lyford became President and CEO of West Health on September 4, 2015. Lyford played a critical role in establishing the Gary and Mary West Foundation in 2006 and has spearheaded the development of innovative healthcare delivery ecosystems that serve as national care models of excellence.

Timothy Lash is the Chief Strategy Officer and Executive Vice President of West Health and oversees the development and execution of West Health's successful aging portfolio across its nonprofit applied medical research, policy and advocacy initiatives and outcomes-based philanthropy.

Dr. Zia Agha is the Chief Medical Officer of West Health leads the development and execution of clinical research activities and brings a comprehensive understanding of the evolving field of clinical informatics such as clinical information systems, telehealth, and data science.

Members of the Board of Directors for the West Health Institute: Gary West, Nicholas J. Valeriani, Charles Sederstrom, Mark McClellan

Members of the Board of Directors for the West Health Policy Center: Gary West, Nicholas J. Valeriani, Mark McClellan

Members of the Board of Directors for the Gary and Mary West Foundation: Gary West, Mary West, Shelley Lyford, Marc Harper, Timothy A. Lash

Milestones

2021 
 University of Pittsburgh School of Pharmacy and West Health Policy Center publish research showing disparities in access to COVID-19 vaccination sites between Black and White Americans.
 Working with community partners, Gary and Mary West PACE establish first-of-its-kind seniors-only COVID-19 vaccination site in San Diego County.
 California's first Master Plan for Aging is released with help of the Gary and Mary West Foundation.
 Dartmouth-Hitchcock Health and West Health announce initiative to bring accredited geriatric emergency care and telehealth services to older adults in the Northern New England, home to one of the fastest-growing senior populations in the country.

2020 
 Gary and Mary West are awarded US San Diego's Chancellor's Medal, its highest honor, for their significant impact on the community through the UCSD Senior Emergency Care Unit and the San Diego County Geriatric Emergency Department Initiative.
 University of Pittsburgh School of Pharmacy and West Health Policy Center develop VaxMap, a tool that identifies counties in the U.S. where residents may face difficulties accessing COVID-19 vaccination sites.
 Duke-Margolis Center for Health Policy and West Health issue two strategic roadmaps with recommendations for advancing value-based payment reform in the U.S.
 For only the second time in its near 80-year history, the American Geriatrics Society (AGS) will present its David S. Solomon Public Service Award, one of its highest honors typically reserved for individuals, to West Health in a ceremony during AGS 2021.
 West Health and Gallup conduct national surveys that reveal nearly 9 in 10 U.S. adults are concerned that the pharmaceutical industry will leverage the COVID-19 pandemic to raise drug prices and 50% of U.S. adults fear bankruptcy due to a major health event.

2019 
 The state-of-the-art the Gary and Mary West Senior Emergency Care Unit at Jacobs Medical Center opens its doors. The 11-bed facility located within the existing ED features geriatric care specialists and architectural elements designed for older patients.
 Official ribbon-cutting today of the Gary and Mary West PACE in San Marcos, California, which was established with a grant from the Gary and Mary West Foundation.
 The Gary and Mary West Senior Dental Center opens its second location within the Gary and Mary West PACE, becoming one of the first programs in the nation to have a co-located state-of-the-art dental facility, serving both PACE participants and area seniors.
 West Health's Shelley Lyford is appointed to California's Master Plan for Aging Stakeholder Advisory Committee, a group of civic leaders that will help guide how California addresses the health and human services and social support needs of its fast-growing senior population.
 West Health and Gallup conduct national survey that finds Americans collectively borrowing an estimated $88 billion to cover healthcare costs in the past year.
 The Committee for a Responsible Federal Budget and West Health Policy Center launch Health Savers Initiative, a collaborative research project to develop bold policy solutions to lower health care costs.

2018
 The Gary and Mary West Foundation becomes a founding member of newly-formed Civica Rx, a nonprofit generic drug company and is one of three philanthropies to provide initial funding of $10 million. 
 West Health and NORC at the University of Chicago conduct national survey that finds 44% of Americans skip doctor visits and 40% skipped a medical test or treatment because of its cost. 
 Gary and Mary West Emergency Department at Jacob Medical Center in La Jolla is the first west of the Mississippi to receive a Level 1 Gold accreditation —the highest and most comprehensive designation given to geriatric emergency departments by the American College of Emergency Physicians (ACEP).

2017
 Gary and Mary West were named outstanding philanthropists by the San Diego Chapter of the Association of Fundraising Professionals

2016
 $11.8 million in grants from Gary and Mary West established the Gary and Mary West Senior Emergency Care Unit at UC San Diego's Thornton Hospital, the first emergency department in region solely focused on seniors.

2015
 Shelley Lyford named President and CEO of West Health. 
 The APCD Council and West Health Policy Center launched APCD Manual to drive healthcare price transparency.
 Mark McClellan named to boards of West Health Institute and West Health Policy Center.

2014
 Research study on telecommunications-based care coordination with West Health Institute, Vanderbilt University Medical Center and West Corporation announced.
 West Health released study showing healthcare price transparency could save $100 billion over ten years.
 West Health released study showing potential benefits of value-based insurance design to high-deductible health plans.
 West Health Policy Center launched study with Harvard University and University of Michigan on insurance options for chronically-ill patients.
 WHI and the Office of the National Coordinator for Health Information Technology (ONC) co-hosted HCI-DC 2014: Igniting an Interoperable Health Care System conference in Washington, D.C.

2013
 Institute announced research study on telecommunications-based care coordination with Vanderbilt University Medical Center and West Health.
 The West Health Institute and the West Foundation created Center for Medical Interoperability to improve patient safety and lower costs of healthcare.
 Dr. Joe Smith testifies at a hearing before the House Energy and Commerce Subcommittee on Health about medical interoperability.
 WHI released study: "The Value of Medical Device Interoperability: Improving patient care with more than $30 billion in annual health care savings.
 Institute demonstrated research advances in medical device interoperability to lower the cost of healthcare.

2012
 West Health Institute launched American Journal of Preventive Medicine Supplement focused on healthcare cost crisis at mHealth Summit.
 West Health Institute licensed Kinect-based physical therapy technology to Reflexion Health.
 West Health Institute unveiled new Kinect-based physical therapy technology, launches research studies with Naval Medical Center San Diego.
 Sense4Baby, Inc. licensed Wireless Fetal Monitoring System in WHI's first technology transfer.
 Nick Valeriani Named CEO of West Health Institute, West Wireless Health Institute changed name to West Health Institute, West Health Incubator unveiled as fourth entity in West Health.
 Medical Grade Wireless Utility unveiled, hospital leaders champion IT solutions to lower health care costs.
 West Wireless Health Institute hosted HCI-DC 2012 with Centers for Medicare & Medicaid Services (CMS) as cohost.
 West Health Policy Center launched in Washington, D.C., targets $100B in common sense health care savings.

2011
 WWHI hosted second Health Care Innovation Day (HCI-DC), cohosted with the U.S. Food and Drug Administration.

2010
 WWHI developed its first engineered prototype, Sense4Baby, a non-invasive wireless device designed to make fetal and maternal monitoring more readily available to expectant mothers.
 WWHI hosted inaugural Health Care Innovation Day (HCI-DC) with U.S. Department of Veterans Affairs as cohost.
 Carlos Slim Health Institute and West Wireless Health Institute partnered on Wireless Health Initiatives in U.S., Mexico and throughout Latin America.

2009
 West Health Institute is established to focus applied medical research on models of care, social services for seniors, telehealth and healthcare costs.

2006
 Creation of Gary and Mary West Foundation, one of only a handful of private foundations focused on seniors and the aging of America.

References

External links
 West Health

Medical research institutes in Washington, D.C.
Non-profit organizations based in the United States
La Jolla, San Diego
Medical research institutes in California